The Journal of Modern African Studies is a quarterly academic journal of African studies covering developments in modern African politics and society. Its main emphasis is on current issues in African politics, economies, societies, and international relations. The journal is published by Cambridge University Press and as of 2018 its editors-in-chief are Ian Taylor (St. Andrews University) and Ebenezer Obadare (Council on Foreign Relations). It was edited by Leonardo A. Villalón (University of Florida) and Paul Nugent (University of Edinburgh) from 2012-2017, and by Christopher Clapham (University of Cambridge) from 1997 to 2012. David Kimble (National University of Lesotho) served as its founding editor from 1963 to 1997.

Abstracting and indexing
The journal is abstracted and indexed in: 
EBSCO databases
International Bibliography of the Social Sciences
ProQuest databases 
Scopus
Social Sciences Citation Index
According to the Journal Citation Reports, the journal has a 2021 impact factor of 1.137.

Notable articles

 "Explaining the 1994 genocide in Rwanda" - Helen M. Hintjens, Jun 1999 37:2, pp 241-286
 "China's engagement in Africa: scope, significance and consequences" - Denis M. Tull, Sep 2006 44:3, pp 459-479
 "Business environment and entrepreneurial activity in Nigeria: implications for industrial development" - Mary Agboli and Chikwendu Christian Ukaegbu, Mar 2006 44:1, pp 1-30
 "Diamonds or development? A structural assessment of Botswana's forty years of success" - Ellen Hillbom, Jun 2008 46:2, pp 191-214

References

External links

20th century in Africa
21st century in Africa
African studies journals
Cambridge University Press academic journals
English-language journals
Publications established in 1963
Quarterly journals